Gerard van Heukelum (1834–1910) was a clergyman and art connoisseur.

Early life 
He was born on 20 December 1834 and died on 30 June 1910. He was the son of Henrikus van Heukelum, a brick manufacturer, and Amoldina Arntz. He founded the Guild of St. Bernulphus in 1869.

Van Heukelum's father, originally a farmer, had ended up in the brick industry through his marriage to a brickworker's daughter. By allowing his children to marry into other brickworker families, a kind of oligarchy was created that has dominated the economic life in the Liemers and the Over-Betuwe.

Mid life and career 

Van Heukelum played a crucial role in church building in the diocese of Utrecht in the second half of the 19th century. This art connoisseur was an avid collector of medieval ecclesiastical art and an advocate for the Gothic Revival architectural style.

References

External links

Sources 
 

1834 births
1910 deaths
Dutch architects
Dutch ecclesiastical architects
Dutch Roman Catholics
Dutch art collectors